Brash is a surname. Notable people with the surname include:

 Alan Brash (1913–2002), leading minister of the Presbyterian Church of Aotearoa New Zealand
 Alan Brash (pharmacologist) (born 1949), Scottish pharmacologist
 Don Brash (born 1940), former New Zealand politician
 Marion Brash (1931–2022), American actress
 Matt Brash (veterinarian), British veterinarian and television presenter
 Matt Brash (baseball), (born 1998), Canadian baseball player
 Peter Brash (born 1954), American television soap opera writer
 Thomas Brash (1874–1957), leading figure in New Zealand's dairy industry
 William W. Brash III, American judge